Beatriz Adriana Flores de Saracho (born 5 March 1958), commonly known as Beatriz Adriana, is a Mexican singer of ranchera.

Beatriz Adriana was born on 5 March 1958 in Navojoa, Sonora, and moved to Mexico City in 1970. She appeared in her first film, La Comadrita, at age 15 alongside La India María.

She has a recognized artistic trajectory in her country of origin. She is also the ex-wife of Mexican singer Marco Antonio Solís, with whom she has a daughter, also named Beatriz Adriana (but performs under the name Beatriz Solís). Adriana became a grandmother when her daughter Beatriz gave birth to a son, Leonardo.

They also had a son named Leonardo Martínez, who was murdered by kidnappers in 2000. Fearing for the life of her daughter Betty, she moved to the United States.

References

External links
 

1958 births
Living people
Mexican women singers
People from Navojoa
People from Tijuana
Singers from Sonora
Singers from Baja California
Mexican emigrants to the United States